Thyreus elegans is a species of bee in the subfamily Apinae. It is found in Eurasia and Africa.

References

External links 

 
 Thyreus elegans at insectoid.info

Apinae
Insects described in 1878